Clausinella fasciata, the banded venus, is a marine bivalve mollusc in the family Veneridae.

Fossil record
Fossils of Clausinella fasciata are found in marine strata from the Miocene until the Quaternary (age range: from 20.43 to 0.012 million years ago). Fossils are known from various localities in Cyprus, Italy, Germany, United Kingdom, Morocco and Spain.

Description
Surface colour is variable; red, pink, purple, yellow or brown with radiating bands and colourful streaks. It may have up to fifteen broad concentric ridges on older specimens. The interior is dull white.

Distribution and habitat
The banded venus has a recorded distribution and common around all coasts of the British Isles.

References

Veneridae
Molluscs of the Atlantic Ocean
Marine molluscs of Europe
Bivalves described in 1778
Taxa named by Emanuel Mendes da Costa